Armand Apell (January 16, 1905 in Strasbourg, German Empire – July 3, 1990) was a French boxer. He competed in the 1928 Summer Olympics.

In 1928, Apell won the silver medal in the flyweight class after losing the final against Antal Kocsis.

1928 Olympic results

Below are the bouts Armand Apell (France) fought in the flyweight division at the 1928 Amsterdam Olympics:

 Round of 16: defeated Frankie Martin (Canada) on points
 Quarterfinal: defeated Cuthbert Taylor (Great Britain) on points
 Semifinal: defeated Baddie Lebanon (South Africa) on points
 Final: lost to Antal Kocsis (Hungary) on points (was awarded silver medal)

References
 Armand Apell's profile at databaseOlympics
 Armand Apell's profile at Sports Reference.com

1905 births
1990 deaths
Sportspeople from Strasbourg
Flyweight boxers
Olympic boxers of France
Boxers at the 1928 Summer Olympics
Olympic silver medalists for France
Olympic medalists in boxing
French male boxers
People from Alsace-Lorraine
Medalists at the 1928 Summer Olympics